The Minton–Capehart Federal Building is a United States federal building in Indianapolis, Indiana, that is named in honor of former U.S. Senator and U.S. Supreme Court Justice Sherman Minton and former U.S. Senator Homer E. Capehart.

The building was designed by Indianapolis architect Evans Woollen III, the principal and founder of Woollen, Molzan and Partners. Completed in 1975, the structure is notable for its exposed concrete slabs, which are typical of the Brutalist architecture style. Some have called the $20 million project a "pigeon coop" and "the ugliest building in Indianapolis." Boston City Hall, completed in 1968, is similar in design and may have served as inspiration for Woollen.

The concrete building includes  of flexible office on five floors and a parking garage level for 500 cars. Its distinctive, horizontal façade tilts outward as the square footage of each upper floor increases, forming an inverted ziggurat.

Graphic designer Milton Glaser, designer of the stylized I Love New York heart logo, designed the building's graphic rainbow mural, Color Fuses, another notable feature of the building. The colorful mural wraps around the exterior's base. Many local residents disliked the colorful mural, which has faded over time, as well as the building's stark design, but architects have considered it one of the city's few "cutting-edge designs from the 1970s."

The building was listed on the National Register of Historic Places in 2021.

References

External links

 Minton–Capehart Federal Building at USGSA

Federal buildings in the United States
Government buildings completed in 1976
Brutalist architecture in Indiana
Buildings and structures in Indianapolis
1976 establishments in Indiana
National Register of Historic Places in Indianapolis